Miķelis Lībietis and Dennis Novikov were the defending champions but only Lībietis chose to defend his title, partnering Tennys Sandgren. Lībietis lost in the first round to Sam Barry and Peter Kobelt.

David O'Hare and Joe Salisbury won the title after defeating Luke Bambridge and Cameron Norrie 6–3, 6–4 in the final.

Seeds

Draw

References
 Main Draw

Columbus Challenger 2 - Doubles
Columbus Challenger